Ijaiye (or Ijaye) was a short-lived kingdom in what is today Oyo State, Nigeria. It broke away from the Oyo Empire in 1836 and was reconquered in 1861.

References

 War of the Ijaye Succession 1859-1861
 World Statesmen.org

History of Nigeria

Former countries in Africa